Aurana actiosella is a species of snout moth in the genus Aurana. It was described by Francis Walker in 1863 and is found in Australia.

References

External links
 
 

Moths described in 1863
Phycitini
Moths of Australia